The Kikeriki (Cock-a-doodle-do) was a satirical magazine published in Vienna, Austria, between 1861 and 1933.

History
The paper was successful and popular until the time of the First Republic. In the best times the circulation was 25,000 copies.

Until the 1880s the paper had a liberal orientation. Under the increasing influence of the right-wing's Christians around Karl Lueger, Kikeriki became sharply anti-Semitic. In 1933, because of his partisanship of the Reich German National Socialists who came to power on January 30, the Kikeriki was prohibited by the Austrofascist Party Government of Engelbert Dollfuß.

References

External links
 Julia Schäfer: Vermessen – gezeichnet – verlacht. Judenbilder in populären Zeitschriften 1918–1933. Campus Verlag, Frankfurt, M. 2005. 

 
 

Antisemitic publications
Antisemitic works
Defunct magazines published in Austria
Magazines established in 1861
Magazines disestablished in 1933
Magazines published in Vienna
Satirical magazines published in Europe